Amjad Khan Afridi is a Pakistani politician hailing from Kohat District. He served as a member of the 10th Khyber Pakhtunkhwa Assembly. He is known as one of the most influential personalities in KPK.

References

Living people
Pashtun people
Khyber Pakhtunkhwa MPAs 2013–2018
People from Kohat District
Pakistan Tehreek-e-Insaf politicians
Year of birth missing (living people)